Stephen van Dyck is a Los Angeles, California and Albuquerque, New Mexico based writer and artist. He is the author of People I've Met From the Internet, and organizer of the Los Angeles Road Concerts.

Books
People I've Met From the Internet is an experimental memoir in the form of a very long annotated list of the people van Dyck met online from 1997 to 2009. Through the annotations, van Dyck tells a queer reimagining of the coming-of-age story that contends with loss and a never-quite-arriving to adulthood. In a review for Zyzzyva, Julia Matthews called the book "the ultimate memoir for the Information Age: a series of extraordinarily personal vignettes derived from a data spreadsheet." Of People I've Met From the Internet, the novelist John Rechy wrote: "This is an impressive work, modern, relevant, powerfully startling in its effect." Writer Chris Kraus called it "a brilliantly written, taxonomic account of growing up queer at the turn of the millennium." The filmmaker Miranda July tweeted that the book was "unputdownable."

Curatorial projects
In 2008 van Dyck founded Los Angeles Road Concerts, a semi-annual series of all-day arts events in which artists of all kinds perform and install works in unused public spaces.

In 2018 van Dyck collaborated with the Los Angeles County Metropolitan Transportation Authority on Changes, a showing on 20 artists and performers in and around LA's Union Station.

Other works
From 2012 to 2016, Van Dyck hosted a radio show called Customer Care on KCHUNG Radio in Los Angeles. On his show, van Dyck contacted debt collectors, customer service agents, and telemarketers, and through an episodic narrative about his debts and CalArts defaulted loans, he and they talked about their personal lives.

Bibliography
People I've Met From the Internet. Los Angeles, CA. Ricochet Editions. 2019

References

External links
 "Stephen van Dyck" Official website. 
 "4 books I read recently and loved." Dennis Cooper's Blog. 
 "Grindr World." The Gay & Lesbian Review.
 ‘People I’ve Met From the Internet’ by Stephen van Dyck: Delight in the Details. Zyzzyva Magazine.
 Literary LA: Stephen Van Dyck Meets People on the Internet. Los Angeles Review of Books.

1983 births
Living people
Performance art in Los Angeles
American gay writers
21st-century American memoirists
LGBT people from New Mexico
LGBT people from California
People from Albuquerque, New Mexico
Writers from Los Angeles
Writers from New Mexico
21st-century American male writers
Occidental College alumni
California Institute of the Arts alumni
American people of Dutch descent
American people of German-Russian descent